Jenison Shafto (c. 1728 – 13 May 1771), of West Wratting Park, Cambridgeshire, was an English politician, race-horse owner, and gambler.

He was second son of Robert Shafto of Benwell Towers, Northumberland.  He served in the army with the 1st Foot Guards, being commissioned as ensign in 1745 and retiring as lieutenant in 1755.

He was a Member (MP) of the Parliament of Great Britain for Leominster from 1761 to 1768 and for Castle Rising from 1768 until his death.  His only recorded speech in the House of Commons was made on 18 March 1762, proposing the militia be sent to serve abroad, during the Seven Years' War, reputedly done to win a wager of £200 laid at his London club, Arthur's.

As a horse owner, Shafto's thoroughbred racers included: Snap, which he bought in 1752  and sold after it had won three 1000-guinea match races at Newmarket; Squirrel, another successful racer which was retired for stud in 1760 and lived until 1780; and Goldfinder, sired by Snap, which won two Newmarket Challenge Cups and Whips before being sold to stud.

He was reported to have rode 100 miles every day for 29 days to Newmarket Heath, and then for 50 miles for 2 hours, for bets. In 1763, his reputation as a winning gambler at Newmarket was such that Horace Walpole wrote to Lord Hertford: "The beginning of October, one is certain everybody will be at Newmarket, and the Duke of Cumberland will lose, and Shafto win, two or three thousand pounds".

He committed suicide, having shot himself, in May 1771, which many attributed to gambling losses on the turf and elsewhere He had married on 24 November 1750 Margaret, daughter and co-heiress of Thomas Allen who was one of the main coal-owners of County Durham.  The couple had no children and she died in 1766. After his death his brother Robert continued to run his West Wratting stables until his own death in 1780.

References

1728 births
1771 deaths
People from West Wratting
British MPs 1761–1768
British MPs 1768–1774
Members of the Parliament of Great Britain for English constituencies
Suicides by firearm in England